Alexander Allardyce (21 January 1846 – 23 April 1896) was a Scottish author, journalist and historian. He wrote for Friend of India, Indian Statesman, Fraser's Magazine, the Spectator among other publications, and was at one time the editor of the Ceylon Times.

Life
Allardyce was the son of James Allardyce, farmer, born on 21 January 1846 at Tilly-minit, Gartly, parish of Rhynie, Aberdeenshire. Receiving his first lessons in Latin from his maternal grandmother), he was educated at Rhynie parish school, Aberdeen Grammar School, and the University of Aberdeen. In 1868 he became sub-editor of the Friend of India at Serampore, Bengal. Lord Mayo appreciated him so highly that he offered him an assistant-commissionership, but he kept to journalism.

Allardyce was on the Friend of India until 1875, having apparently at the same time done work for the Indian Statesman. In 1875, he succeeded John Capper as editor of the Ceylon Times, and one of his early experiences of office was tendering an apology to the judicial bench for contempt.

Returning to Europe, Allardyce was for a time at Berlin and afterwards in London, where he wrote for Fraser's Magazine, The Spectator, and other periodicals. In 1877 he settled at Edinburgh as reader to the house of Messrs. William Blackwood and Sons, and assistant-editor of Blackwood's Magazine. He died at Portobello on 23 April 1896, and was buried in Rhynie parish churchyard, Aberdeenshire.

Works
Allardyce wrote:

 The City of Sunshine, 1877; 2nd edit. 1894; a tale of Indian life and manners. 
 Memoir of Viscount Keith of Stonehaven Marischal, Admiral of the Red, 1882.
 Balmoral, a Romance of the Queen's Country, 1893; a Jacobite tale. 
 Earlscourt, a Novel of Provincial Life, 1894.

In 1888 he edited two rare works (each in 2 vols.):

 the Ochtertyre MSS. of John Ramsay under the title of Scotland and Scotsmen in the Eighteenth Century, and 
 Letters from and to Charles Kirkpatrick Sharpe.

Allardyce regularly wrote political and literary articles for Blackwood's Magazine, and short stories as in the third series of Tales from Blackwood. At the time of his death he was preparing the volume on Aberdeenshire for Messrs. Blackwood's series of county histories.

Family
When comparatively young Allardyce married his cousin, Barbara Anderson, who survived him. There were no children.

References

Attribution

1846 births
1896 deaths
19th-century Scottish writers
People from Marr
Alumni of the University of Aberdeen
Scottish editors
Scottish journalists
19th-century British journalists
British male journalists
19th-century British male writers
19th-century British writers